"Taste You" is the second and final single to be taken from Australian singer Cheyne Coates debut album.

Track listing
CD Single
Taste You (Radio edit)
Taste You (Emc mix)
Taste You (Sweeter Than Bee Pollen mix)
Taste You (Alleycat Mix)
I've Got Your Number (Original)

Charts

References

2004 singles
2004 songs
Songs written by Cheyne Coates